The Network of Women for Rights and Peace (RFDP) is a women's rights organization in the Democratic Republic of the Congo. Founded in 1999, it gives judicial support to victims of sexual violence, raises awareness about human rights and democracy, and works to increase women's literacy through a network of grassroots organizations, the Comités d’Alerte pour la Paix (CAP).

RDFP was founded by the activist Vénantie Bisimwa, who is its Executive Secretary.  Based in Bukavu, the RFDP is a founder member of the Coalition Against Sexual Violence in the DRC.

Publications
 (with the Network of Women for Development) Women’s Bodies as a Battleground: Sexual Violence Against Women and Girls During the War in the Democratic Republic of Congo. 2005

References

Women's rights organizations
Feminist organisations in the Democratic Republic of the Congo
Organizations established in 1999
1999 establishments in the Democratic Republic of the Congo
South Kivu
Violence against women in the Democratic Republic of the Congo